KMSL may refer to:

 KMSL (FM), a radio station (91.7 FM) licensed to Mansfield, Louisiana, United States
 the ICAO code for Northwest Alabama Regional Airport, in Muscle Shoals, Alabama, United States